Boris Nešović (born 7 June 1971) is a former Macedonian professional basketball small forward who last played for Karpoš Sokoli.

References

External links
 

1971 births
Living people
Macedonian men's basketball players
Macedonian people of Serbian descent
Small forwards
Sportspeople from Skopje